The Rural Municipality of Abernethy No. 186 is a rural municipality (RM) in the Canadian province of Saskatchewan within Census Division No. 6 and  Division No. 1. It is located on the Qu'Appelle River.

History 
The RM of Abernethy No. 186 incorporated as a rural municipality on December 11, 1911.

Geography

Communities and localities 
The following urban municipalities are surrounded by the RM.

Towns
Balcarres

Villages
Abernethy

Resort villages
Katepwa
Katepwa Beach, dissolved as a resort village and amalgamated into Resort Village of the District of Katepwa, July 24, 2004
Katepwa South, dissolved as a resort village and amalgamated into Resort Village of the District of Katepwa, July 24, 2004
Sandy Beach, dissolved as a resort village and amalgamated into Resort Village of the District of Katepwa, July 24, 2004

The following unincorporated communities are within the RM.

Localities
Blackwood
Kenlis
Lorlie

Lakes and rivers
Along the southwest boundary of the RM is Katepwa Lake, which is one of the four Fishing Lakes in the Qu'Appelle Valley. The rest of the southern border follows the Qu'Appelle River.

Demographics 

Attractions 
Motherwell Homestead, a National Historic Site of Canada
Katepwa Point Provincial Park

Government 
The RM of Abernethy No. 186 is governed by an elected municipal council and an appointed administrator that meets on the second Tuesday of every month. The reeve of the RM is John Fishley while its administrator is Karissa Lingelbach . The RM's office is located in Abernethy.

Transportation 
Rail
Brandon-Virden-Saskatoon Section C.P.R.  – serves Neudorf, Lemberg, Abernethy, Balcarres, Patrick

Roads
Highway 22—serves Balcarres, Saskatchewan [west]
Highway 10—serves Balcarres, Saskatchewan [east]
Highway 310—serves Balcarres, Saskatchewan [north]
Highway 619—serves Balcarres, Saskatchewan [south]

See also 
List of rural municipalities in Saskatchewan

References 

A
Division No. 6, Saskatchewan